Leo A. "Barney" Barnhorst (May 11, 1924 – August 25, 2000) was an American basketball player.

A 6'4" forward/guard from Cathedral High School in Indianapolis, Barnhorst played four seasons at University of Notre Dame, where he was an honorable mention All-American. He then played professionally in the NBA for the Chicago Stags, Indianapolis Olympians, Baltimore Bullets and Fort Wayne Pistons.  Barnhorst appeared in two NBA All-Star Games (1952, 1953) and scored 3,232 career points.

Barnhorst was inducted into the Indiana Basketball Hall of Fame in 1980.

Career statistics

NBA
Source

Regular season

Playoffs

References

External links

Indiana Basketball Hall of Fame profile

1924 births
2000 deaths
Baltimore Bullets (1944–1954) players
Basketball players from Indianapolis
Chicago Stags players
Fort Wayne Pistons players
Indianapolis Olympians draft picks
Indianapolis Olympians players
National Basketball Association All-Stars
Notre Dame Fighting Irish men's basketball players
Small forwards
American men's basketball players
United States Army personnel of World War II